The Colours Match is an annual rugby union fixture between the University of Dublin and University College Dublin. Rugby matches between UCD RFC and DUFC predate the inauguration of "The Colours Match". Their first meeting took place at Terenure on 18 October 1919, won by Trinity.

Background
Between 1919 and 1952 "friendly" matches took place annually between the clubs on a home and away basis. There were also memorable encounters between UCD and TCD in the Leinster Senior Cup when the draw brought the sides together.

Following the Senior Cup win of UCD over DUFC in 1948 by a dropped goal to nil, the idea of a Colours match was discussed between Harry Thrift of Trinity and Sarsfield Hogan of UCD, who had served together on the International Rugby Board, on which basis each University club would award Colours for the season. Lengthy negotiations ensued and with the cooperation of the IRFU committee and of the Lansdowne and Wanderers RFCs a scheme for an annual Colours match was finally agreed.

The two Universities would play once a year in December. Each University would act as the host in turn and be responsible for the management of the match and for the entertainment. The host University, after consultation with the other side, would invite the referee for the match. A formal teams' dinner would be held after the match.

It was envisaged that the match would be played on a Saturday. Increasing numbers of representative matches and the limited number of Saturdays on which Lansdowne Road was available led to pressure to change the match from Saturdays to a mid-week date.

History
The Colours Match was inaugurated on 13 December 1952 at Lansdowne Road with the first title taken by UCD Trinity gained their first win in 1954 and the first drawn match came in 1955. The first 26 matches and the 35th to 38th matches were held at Lansdowne Road stadium in Dublin. The 27th to 33rd fixtures and the 39th through 60th matches were played at Donnybrook Rugby Ground, the traditional home of the Leinster rugby union team. The 61st 63rd, 65th and 67th encounters took place at the UCD Bowl, Belfield, the 62nd match at Donnybrook Rugby Ground and the 64th, 66th and 68th editions in College Park Rugby Ground, Trinity College.

Trophy
A trophy, The Colours Cup, presented to the winner of the annual Colours Match, was inaugurated in 2002 to mark the Golden Jubilee of the first Colours Match in December 1962. It was first presented to the winners of the 51st Colours Match, UCD, in November 2002. The cup is in the form of a claret jug.

Trinity College are the current holders beating University College by 34 points to 27 points on 1 April 2022 at College Park, Trinity College.

Other editions
Colours Matches are also played between Trinity and UCD in women's rugby union and other sports, such as association football, Gaelic football, hurling, swimming, boxing, water polo, field hockey, golf, sailing, tennis, and fencing.

Famous participants
Dick Spring Politician Trinity College
Peter Sutherland Chairman BP University College
Brian O'Driscoll Ireland Captain University College
Jamie Heaslip Ireland Captain Trinity College
Paddy Johns Ireland Captain Trinity College

Results

1950s

 Acting Captain

1960s

 Acting Captain

1970s

 Acting Captain

1980s

Acting Captain

1990s

2000s

2010s

2020s

By total wins

References

College sports rivalries
Rugby union competitions in Ireland
Rugby union at Irish universities
Dublin University Football Club
University College Dublin R.F.C.
Recurring sporting events established in 1952
Rugby union rivalries in Ireland
1952 establishments in Ireland
University and college rugby union competitions
Sports competitions at Irish universities